is a passenger railway station located in the city of Narita, Chiba Prefecture, Japan, operated by the private railway company Keisei Electric Railway.

Lines
Kōzunomori Station is served by the Keisei Main Line. It lies 58.6 km from the Tokyo terminus of the Keisei Main Line at Keisei Ueno Station. It is the first station after Keisei Narita on the way towards Nippori, Ueno and Tokyo. However, Morningliner, Eveningliner and Limited Express (Green) trains do not stop here.

Station layout
Kōzunomori Station has two opposed side platforms connected to an elevated station building.

Platforms

History
Kōzunomori Station was opened on 1 April 1994.

Station numbering was introduced to all Keisei Line stations on 17 July 2010; Kōzunomori Station was assigned station number KS39.

Passenger statistics
In fiscal 2019, the station was used by an average of 14,034 passengers daily (boarding passengers only).

Surrounding area
 Kozunomori Community Center (Morinpia)
 Narita Wholesale Market
 Narita Aviation Business College
 Narita City Kozunomori Junior High School
 Narita City Kozunomori Elementary School

See also
 List of railway stations in Japan

References

External links

 Keisei Station layout 

Railway stations in Chiba Prefecture
Railway stations in Japan opened in 1994
Railway stations in Narita, Chiba
Keisei Main Line